Bad Bramstedt is a municipality in the district of Segeberg, in Schleswig-Holstein, Germany. It is situated approximately 40 km north of Hamburg. It is famous for its statue of Roland and its rheumatism clinic.

Geography and transport
Bad Bramstedt lies 49 kilometers southwest of Kiel, 54 kilometers west of Lübeck, and 40 kilometers north of Hamburg on the historical Ox Road. The Altona-Kieler Chaussee (L318/L319) passes through the town. This about 94 kilometer-long Landstraße (state road) was built between 1830 and 1832. The confluence of the Osterau and Hudau rivers, which come together to form the Bramau, is found in Bad Bramstedt.

Notable residents

 Oskar Alexander (1881–1942), founder of the rheumatism clinic in Bad Bramstedt. Murdered in Sachsenhausen concentration camp for being of Jewish descent.
 Fabian Boll (born 1979), German footballer and Kriminaloberkommissar (police official)
 William Crane (1902–1979), surgeon general of the Bundeswehr; died in Bad Bramstedt
 Arved Fuchs, born 1953 in Bad Bramstedt, adventurer, first person to reach both the North and South Pole within one year and by foot.
 Rolf Koschorrek (born 1956), German politician (CDU)
 Karl Lagerfeld (1933–2019), fashion designer, born in Hamburg, but went to school in Bad Bramstedt.
 Siegfried Liebschner (1935–2006), Baptist theologian, born in Bad Bramstedt
 Charles I.D. Looff (1852–1918), "father" of the amusement parks in America, builder of many roundabouts and the pier of Santa Monica
 Johanna Mestorf (1828–1909), first female museum director in Germany and first woman in Prussia to hold the title of professor, born in Bad Bramstedt
 Heinrich Christian Schumacher (1780–1850), astronomer.

 Augusta Louise zu Stolberg-Stolberg (1753–1835), corresponded with Goethe as Gustchen
 Friedrich Leopold zu Stolberg-Stolberg (1715–1819), poet, lawyer and translator
 Kurt Gustav Wilckens (1886–1923), militant German anarchist.

References

External links
 Official website

Segeberg
Spa towns in Germany